Kristian Lindbom (born 18 September 1989) is an Australian racing car driver from Sydney, Australia. He now lives in Melbourne, Australia. Lindbom presently drives for Evans Motorsport Group in the Dunlop V8 Supercar Series. Kristian is a driver coach for Fast Track Racing, Mercedes-Benz, Lexus, Aston Martin and Australian Formula Ford team Evans Motorsport Group.

Karts

Lindbom won multiple titles in Australia in his youth. In 2002 he won the AKA Australian Junior National Championship on dirt. In 2003 he moved to circuit karts and won the CIK/FIA Australian Junior Intercontinental A Championship. In 2004 he won two titles in the AKA Australian Junior Clubman and CIK/FIA Australian Junior Intercontinental A classes. In 2005 he was the AKA Australian Formula 100 Champion.

Formula Ford 

Lindbom began competing in State level races, finishing second in the Victorian and fourth in the New South Wales Championships. He then competed in the Australian Formula Ford Championship from 2006 through to 2008 for Borland Racing Developments (2006–2007) and Sonic Motor Racing Services (2008). Over the three years he won six races, 28 podiums, three pole positions and four fastest laps.

Formula 3 

In the 2009 and 2010 seasons he had showings in Formula 3 on three occasions with limited success due to a lack of testing laps prior to races.

In 2011, at the Hidden Valley Raceway round of V8 Supercars whilst working for Lucas Dumbrell Motorsport, a car capable of race wins became vacant.  Fifteen minutes before the first qualifying session, Lindbom sat in the car for the first time and the first time in 14 months. He drove out of the garage in a formula car and finished the session in 1st place. He then went on to win the inaugural City of Darwin Cup.

GP3 Series

On 2/3 December 2011, Lindbom tested competitively for the Tech 1 Racing in Jerez, Spain.

Supercars 

Lindbom tested with Lucas Dumbrell Motorsport in August 2011 and later in September he tested for Walkinshaw Racing at Winton.

In February 2012 it was announced that Lindbom would compete in Adelaide in the Dunlop V8 Supercar Series for Lucas Dumbrell Motorsport, financed by Fast Track Communications. Lindbom raced competitively in his debut race and placed 10th.

In February 2013 it was announced that Lindbom would again compete in the Dunlop V8 Supercar Series, this year for Evans Motorsport Group racing EMG’s FPR-built FG Falcon.

Lindbom entered the Dunlop Series Queensland Raceway round in 2014 with Dragon Motor Racing with a view to participating in the main series Enduro Cup that season. Lindbom retired from the weekend and the wildcard bid was unsuccessful.

Lindbom made a surprise return to the grid in 2018, with a one-off drive for Kali Motorsport at the 2018 Super2 Series finale in Newcastle.

Career summary

Complete Super2 Series results
(key) (Round results only)

References

External References
 Official Website
 

1989 births
Australian Formula 3 Championship drivers
Formula Ford drivers
Living people
Racing drivers from Sydney
Supercars Championship drivers